() or  or fardh in Islam is a religious duty commanded by God. The word is also used in Turkish, Persian, Pashto, Urdu (spelled farz), and Malay (spelled fardu or fardhu) in the same meaning. Muslims who obey such commands or duties are said to receive hasanat, ajr or thawab each time for each good deed.

Fard or its synonym wājib is one of the five types of ahkam into which fiqh categorizes acts of every Muslim.  The Hanafi fiqh, however, does not consider both terms to be synonymous, and makes a distinction between wajib and fard, the latter being obligatory and the former slightly lesser degree than being obligatory.

Individual duty and sufficiency
The Fiqh distinguishes two sorts of duties:

 Individual duty or farḍ al-'ayn relates is required to perform, such as daily prayer (salat), and the pilgrimage to Mecca at least once in a lifetime if the person can afford the journey (hajj). An individual not performing this will be punished in the afterlife (but can be excused on basis of incapability), but if he enjoins and fulfils its necessity will be rewarded.
 Sufficiency duty or farḍ al-kifāya is a duty which is imposed on the whole community of believers (ummah). The classic example for it is janaza (Funeral prayer): the individual is not required to perform it as long as a sufficient number of community members fulfill it.

Examples of fard acts 

 Salah
 Zakat
 Fasting during Ramadan
 Hajj
 Jumuah prayer
 Protecting your children

See also
 Dua
 Makruh
 Mustahabb
 Wallace Fard Muhammad

Ahkam
 Ahkam, commandments, of which fardh are a type
 Mustahabb, recommended but not required

Other religions
 Mitzvah (somewhat similar Jewish concept)
 Dharma (somewhat similar Hindu/Buddhist/Sikh concept)

References

Arabic words and phrases in Sharia
Islamic terminology
Sharia legal terminology
Religious philosophical concepts